Daniel Hérelle (born 17 October 1988) is a professional footballer who plays as a midfielder for Martinique Championnat National club Golden Lion. Born in France, he plays for the Martinique national team at international level.

Career
Hérelle was born in Nice, France. He made his debut for Martinique in 2006. He was in the Martinique Gold Cup squads for the 2013 and 2017  tournaments.

References

External links
 

1988 births
Living people
Martiniquais footballers
French footballers
Footballers from Nice
Association football midfielders
Martinique international footballers
Golden Lion FC players
2019 CONCACAF Gold Cup players
2017 CONCACAF Gold Cup players
2013 CONCACAF Gold Cup players